In enzymology, an ornithine N-benzoyltransferase is an enzyme that catalyzes the chemical reaction

2 benzoyl-CoA + L-ornithine  2 CoA + N2,N5-dibenzoyl-L-ornithine

Thus, the two substrates of this enzyme are benzoyl-CoA and L-ornithine, whereas its two products are CoA and N2,N5-dibenzoyl-L-ornithine.

This enzyme belongs to the family of transferases, specifically those acyltransferases transferring groups other than aminoacyl groups.  The systematic name of this enzyme class is benzoyl-CoA:L-ornithine N-benzoyltransferase. This enzyme is also called ornithine N-acyltransferase.

References

 

EC 2.3.1
Enzymes of unknown structure